Dichloropane ((−)-2β-Carbomethoxy-3β-(3,4-dichlorophenyl)tropane, RTI-111, O-401) is a stimulant of the phenyltropane class that acts as a serotonin–norepinephrine–dopamine reuptake inhibitor (SNDRI) with IC50 values of 3.13, 0.79 and 18 nM, respectively. In animal studies, dichloropane had a slower onset and longer duration of action compared to cocaine.

Methylecgonidine is the direct precursor to this compound.

Trans -CO2Me group
The thermodynamic isomer with a trans -CO2Me group is still active. This isomer was used by Neurosearch to make three different phenyltropanes which were tested in clinical trials.

Tesofensine
Brasofensine
NS-2359 (GSK-372,475)

See also 
 3,4-DCMP
 O-2390
 List of cocaine analogues
 List of phenyltropanes

References 

Chloroarenes
Designer drugs
RTI compounds
Serotonin–norepinephrine–dopamine reuptake inhibitors
Stimulants
Tropanes